Thibault Damour (born 7 February 1951) is a French physicist.

He was a permanent professor in theoretical physics at the Institut des Hautes Études Scientifiques (IHÉS) from 1989 to 2022. Since then, he is professor emeritus. 
An expert in general relativity, he has long taught this theory at the École Normale Supérieure (Ulm). He contributed greatly to the understanding of gravitational waves from compact binary systems, and with Alessandra Buonanno, he invented the "effective one-body" approach to solving the orbital trajectories of binary black holes. He is also a specialist in string theory.

In 2021 he was awarded the Balzan Prize for Gravitation: physical and astrophysical aspects (shared with Alessandra Buonanno) as well as the Galileo Galilei Medal and the Dirac Medal.

References

External links
 Damour's  homepage at IHÉS

1951 births
Living people
French relativity theorists
École Normale Supérieure alumni
Members of the French Academy of Sciences
Scientists from Lyon
Albert Einstein Medal recipients